Kentucky Route 229 (KY 229) is a  state highway in the U.S. state of Kentucky. The highway connects rural areas of Knox and Laurel counties with London.

Route description

Knox County
KY 229 begins at an intersection with U.S. Route 25E (Cumberland Gap Parkway) in Bailey Switch, within Knox County. It travels to the north-northwest, paralleling Richland Creek. It curves to the north-northeast and intersects the eastern terminus of KY 1527. It heads to the northeast and curves to the north. The highway curves to the northwest and intersects the southern terminus of KY 1803. It crosses over Richland Creek and then begins paralleling Knox Fork. KY 229 curves to the north-northwest and leaves the fork. It intersects the northern terminus of KY 1304. Just before it intersects the eastern terminus of KY 1610 (Tuttle Road), it enters Laurel County.

Laurel County
KY 229 crosses over Robinson Creek. Then, it intersects KY 830 (Robinson Creek Road). The two highways travel concurrently, cross over Little Robinson Creek, and passes Robinson Creek Cemetery before they split. KY 229 heads in a west-northwesterly direction. It passes Campground Cemetery and intersects the northern terminus of KY 1023. It travels through Boreing, and then crosses over Laurel River. The highway intersects KY 1189 (Rocky Branch Road/Parkside Road). It then enters Levi Jackson Wilderness Road State Park. There, it intersects the southern terminus of KY 2390 (J.M. Feltner Road). After it leaves the park, it curves to the northwest and crosses the Little Laurel River. The highway then enters London, where it intersects KY 192. On the eastern edge of the Dyche Memorial Park cemetery, KY 229 meets its northern terminus, an intersection with US 25 (South Main Street).

Major intersections

See also

References

0229
Transportation in Knox County, Kentucky
Transportation in Laurel County, Kentucky
London, Kentucky micropolitan area